Stedroy Franklyn Braithwaite (born 2 February 1961) is an Antigua and Barbuda sailor. He competed in the Finn event at the 1992 Summer Olympics.

In 2014, he received the title of Grand Officer Most Precious Order of Princely Heritage (GOH) for "distinguished contribution to sailing and community development" in the Independence Honours list. He is currently Commodore of Antigua Yacht Club. and President of the Antigua and Barbuda Marine Association.

References

External links
 

1961 births
Living people
Antigua and Barbuda male sailors (sport)
Olympic sailors of Antigua and Barbuda
Sailors at the 1992 Summer Olympics – Finn
Place of birth missing (living people)